The Post may refer to:

Newspapers

United States
 New York Post
 The Denver Post
 The Post (Connecticut newspaper)
 The Post (Ohio newspaper)
 The Post (Texas newspaper)
 The Post (Virginia newspaper)
 The Washington Post
 St. Louis Post-Dispatch

Elsewhere
 Post Newspapers, Perth, Australia
 South China Morning Post, Hong Kong
 The Jerusalem Post, Israel
 The Kathmandu Post, Nepal
 The Post (British newspaper), a national tabloid that was published for five weeks in 1988
 The Post (Pakistani newspaper), a national newspaper
 The Post (Zambia)

Arts
The Post (film), a 2017 historical drama film directed by Steven Spielberg about the Pentagon Papers and named after the Washington Post

See also 
 Daily Post (disambiguation)
 Evening Post (disambiguation)
 Morning Post (disambiguation)
 National Post, Canada
 Pittsburgh Post-Gazette, United States
 The Saturday Evening Post (U.S. magazine)
 The Sunday Post, Scotland
 The Sunday Business Post, Ireland
 The Christian Post, an evangelical Christian newspaper published in Washington, D.C., United States
 Posta, Turkish newspaper

Lists of newspapers